The 2020–21 Central Arkansas Bears basketball team represented the University of Central Arkansas (UCA) in the 2020–21 NCAA Division I men's basketball season. The Bears, led by first-year head coach Anthony Boone, played their home games at the on-campus Farris Center in Conway, Arkansas. This was the Bears' last season as members of the Southland Conference; UCA left the Southland in July 2021 to join the ASUN Conference.

Previous season
The Bears finished the 2019–20 season 10–21, 9–11 in Southland play to finish in ninth place. They failed to qualify for the Southland Conference tournament.

Roster

Schedule and results

|-
!colspan=12 style=| Non-conference Regular season

|-
!colspan=12 style=| Southland Regular season

|-

Source

References

Central Arkansas Bears basketball seasons
Central Arkansas Bears
Central Arkansas Bears basketball
Central Arkansas Bears basketball